The Akhmeteli–Varketili Line (formerly known as Didube–Samgori and Gldani–Varketili) is a line of the Tbilisi Metro. The line was part of the first stage of the Metro and currently cuts the city on a north–south axis. The line currently has 16 stations and 19.6 kilometres of track.

History

Name changes

Transfers

Rolling stock
The line is served by the Gldani depot (№2), currently 24 four carriage trains are assigned to it. A mix of Еzh3, Еma-502, Еm-508T as well as the newer 81-714.5, 81-717.5. Additional Ezh3 and Em-508T subway cars were received in 1985 from Tashkent metro. All of the trains are undergoing major repairs and there is also a large carriage reserve park. All the other trains are being retired and scrapped. Type Ezh, Ezh1, was retired from passenger service in 2013. Until 2010, type E was in service since the very opening of the metro. The modernization of the existing fleet includes serious change in the train's interior and exterior, thus replacing the original seats with antivandal seats, the trains receive a new front mask which is with a dot matrix display on the top part. The light system in the interior is refurbished. The trains are repainted into silver grey and red livery. They receive a modification of 81-717M/81-714M, identical to the 81-71M in Prague metro. Similar refurbishments were made for Baku and Yerevan metro.

Recent developments and future plans
Because some of the stations have been operative for over four decades, as well as neglect caused by the lack of funding during the 1990s, most of them require a major facelift and some severe repairs on hydroisolation and structure. Recently there has been progress in both directions. There are unconfirmed proposals of additional proposals, but so far Tbilisi has other projects to be realised.

References

Tbilisi Metro
Railway lines opened in 1966